Madison Brengle (born April 3, 1990) is an American professional tennis player. Her biggest success she had in early 2015, reaching her first WTA Tour final in January, followed by a fourth round major event appearance at the Australian Open. In May, she reached her career-high singles ranking of No. 35. Her greatest victory came in 2017 over world No. 2, Serena Williams. She has won two singles titles and one doubles title on the WTA Challenger Tour, 19 singles and seven doubles titles on the ITF Circuit.

In August 2007, she was ranked fourth in the world in juniors. Brengle then toiled for years in the ITF Circuit. Over the course of 24 consecutive majors between 2008 and 2014, she failed to make it out of the pre-tournament qualifier. The streak ended when she earned a wildcard for the 2014 US Open main draw, which she capitalized on for her first major match-win. Her ranking soon rose into the top 100 for the first time in September 2014.

Early life
Brengle was born and raised in Dover, Delaware, and is Jewish. Her mother (Gaby née Gamberg) coaches her, her father is Dan Brengle, and she has a brother named David.

Playing style
Brengle is what some coaches call a scrappy player, and her game is built around counter-punching and outlasting her opponents in long rallies while waiting for her opponent's error.  When serving she uses an abbreviated service motion. Her forehand has a low follow-through.  Sometimes on her backhand she will drive the ball flat, using a half-swing.  Brengle moves quickly around the court, and is willing to battle to win her matches.

Junior career
As a teenager, Brengle participated in an experimental USTA training regimen.

In 2006, she won the Easter Bowl doubles championships with Kristy Frilling, defeating Sanaz Marand and Ashley Weinhold in the final. In 2007, Brengle reached the Australian Open girls' singles final, before going down to Anastasia Pavlyuchenkova. Brengle and Julia Cohen were the top seeds at the 2007 French Open girls' doubles competition, but the team lost in the first round.

Seeded seventh, Brengle lost in the final of the Wimbledon girls' singles competition to Urszula Radwańska, in three sets. Brengle and Chelsey Gullickson reached the girls' doubles semifinals there before losing to top seeds and eventual champions, Pavlyuchenkova and Radwańska. In August 2007, she was ranked fourth in the world in juniors.

Professional career

2005-06: Early years, first ITF title
2005 saw Brengle win her first ITF title, when, as a 15-year-old, she won a tournament in Baltimore. In the final, she defeated Beau Jones.

2007-08: Grand Slam debut
In 2007, Brengle received wildcard entries into two Grand Slam tournaments, losing in the first round both times. Accepted into the Australian Open main draw, Brengle lost to ninth-seeded Patty Schnyder. She was allowed another wildcard into the US Open, where she lost to Bethanie Mattek-Sands. Brengle and Ashley Weinhold were doubles wildcards, but lost in the first round of the doubles competition to eventual quarterfinalists, Stéphanie Foretz and Yaroslava Shvedova.

Brengle won her first WTA match of the season in August by defeating former top-20 player Flavia Pennetta, before losing to Elena Dementieva in the following round at the 2007 East West Bank Classic WTA tournament in Los Angeles. In addition, earlier in the year, the American reached the second round of the 2007 French Open qualifying draw.

On the ITF Circuit, Brengle reached three out of four singles finals in the first four months of the year. Brengle and Kristy Frilling won an ITF doubles title in Augusta, Georgia. In the final, the team defeated Angelina Gabueva and Alisa Kleybanova.

In 2008, Brengle received a wildcard into the French Open (after winning a playoff tournament), defeating Ahsha Rolle in the finals. The US Open and the French Open agreed to exchange wildcards in their respective tournaments.

2011-13
In 2011, Brengle finally won her second ITF title at Hammond, LA. She also reached the final at another ITF event at Rancho Santa Fe, California. At College Park, she defeated recent Wimbledon third rounder Melinda Czink to win her first WTA Tour match since Quebec City in 2009.

In 2012, Brengle won her third ITF title at Fort Walton Beach, Florida. She also won the doubles title with Paula Kania of Poland.

And in 2013, she won her fourth ITF title at Rancho Santa Fe.

2014: First major match-win, top 100 debut
Brengle had a strong start to her 2014 season, qualifying through to the main draw at the Hobart International, but was narrowly defeated in the first round by top seed Samantha Stosur in a final-set tiebreak. The next week, she was in touching distance of a main-draw berth at the Australian Open, but lost to Irina-Camelia Begu in the final qualifying round. In July, she won the $50k Lexington Challenger, beating Nicole Gibbs in the final. 
Later in the year, she was awarded a wildcard into the main draw of the US Open, where she recorded her first ever Grand Slam win over Julia Glushko of Israel.

She moved into the top 100 for first time on September 29, 2014, after winning the $50k event Redrock Open in Las Vegas defeating Nicole Vaidišová, Kateryna Bondarenko and Michelle Larcher de Brito, all in straight sets.

2015-16: Australian Open fourth round, top 35 debut, career-high ranking

At the 2015 Australian Open Brengle defeated the 13th-ranked Andrea Petkovic in the first round. Then, she won in straight sets against both Irina Falconi and CoCo Vandeweghe, eventually losing in the fourth round to Madison Keys, 2–6, 4–6. This was her best performance in a Grand Slam tournament so far. In Stuttgart, she defeated No. 4 ranked Petra Kvitová, in straight sets. 
In May, her singles ranking reached a career-best of No. 35 in the world.
She finished the 2015 season ranked No. 40.

In 2016 in Dubai, she defeated No. 8 ranked Kvitová in three sets.

2017: First Wimbledon third round
Brengle began her season at the ASB Classic in Auckland. She upset top seed, world No. 2, and compatriot, Serena Williams, in her second-round match. She lost in the quarterfinals to seventh seed Jeļena Ostapenko. At the Australian Open, she was defeated in the first round by compatriot Alison Riske.

As the top seed at the Dow Tennis Classic in Midland, Michigan, Brengle lost in the first round to compatriot Jacqueline Cako.

2019
Brengle started her season at the ASB Classic. She lost in the first round to Eugenie Bouchard.

2020
Brengle began her 2020 season at the Brisbane International. She lost in the second round of qualifying to Yulia Putintseva. In Hobart, she fell in the final round of qualifying to Ons Jabeur. At the Australian Open, she lost in the first round to Caroline Garcia in three sets.

2021
Brengle started her season at the Yarra Valley Classic. She lost in the first round to Anastasija Sevastova. At the Australian Open, she was defeated in the second round by 22nd seed, world No. 24, compatriot, and eventual finalist, Jennifer Brady.

After the Australian Open, Brengle competed at the Phillip Island Trophy. She was eliminated in the second round by second seed and world No. 8, Bianca Andreescu. Getting past qualifying at the Adelaide International, she lost in the first round to fifth seed, world No. 18, and eventual champion, Iga Świątek.

2022: Two WTA 1000 third rounds, back to top 50
Brengle started the 2022 season at the Melbourne Summer Set 1. She lost in the second round to third seed and eventual finalist, Veronika Kudermetova. At the Adelaide International 2, she reached the quarterfinals where she retired against compatriot, Alison Riske, due to a calf injury. At the Australian Open, she won her first-round match when her opponent, Dayana Yastremska, retired hurt. She was defeated in the second round by 13th seed, world No. 14, two-time champion, and former world No. 1, Naomi Osaka.

In February, Brengle competed at the Dubai Championships. She lost in the final round of qualifying to Dayana Yastremska. At the Qatar Total Open in Doha, she reached the third round where she was defeated by fifth seed, world No. 9, two-time finalist, and former world No. 1, Garbiñe Muguruza. In March, she played at the Indian Wells Masters. She lost in the first round to compatriot, Ann Li, in three sets, despite having two match points in the second set. At the Miami Open, she upset 29th seed and world No. 30, Liudmila Samsonova, in the second round in straight sets. She was eliminated in the third round by world No. 2 and eventual champion, Iga Świątek.

Brengle started her clay-court season at the Credit One Charleston Open. She retired during the third set of her first-round match against compatriot Emma Navarro due to a left knee injury. She returned to action at the Mutua Madrid Open. She lost in the first round of qualifying to Dayana Yastremska. As the top seed at the L'Open 35 de Saint-Malo, she reached the quarterfinals where she was beaten by fifth seed Maryna Zanevska. At the Italian Open, she lost in the final round of qualifying to Elina Avanesyan. However, she earned a lucky loser spot into the main draw. She was defeated in the second round by world No. 15 and compatriot, Coco Gauff. At the French Open, she lost in the second round to world No. 7 Aryna Sabalenka.

Brengle started her grass-court season at the Surbiton Trophy. As the top seed, she retired during the third set of her quarterfinal match against Arina Rodionova. At the Libéma Open, she lost in the first round to second seed and world No. 17, Belinda Bencic. Seeded second at the first edition of the Veneto Open, she lost in the first round to eventual finalist Sara Errani. In Eastbourne, she was defeated in the first round by British wildcard Harriet Dart. At Wimbledon, she lost in the first round to compatriot Lauren Davis.

Brengle started her US Open Series at the Citi Open in Washington, D.C. She lost in the first round to Anna Kalinskaya. Getting past qualifying at the National Bank Open in Toronto, she was defeated in the first round by 10th seed Coco Gauff. As the top seed at the Odlum Brown Vancouver Open, she reached the quarterfinals and lost to Emma Navarro. At the Tennis in the Land, she upset 3rd seed and world No. 28, Ekaterina Alexandrova, in the second round. She lost in the quarterfinals to seventh seed and eventual finalist, Aliaksandra Sasnovich. At the US Open, she was beaten in the first round by world No. 5 and eventual finalist, Ons Jabeur.

As the top seed at the Berkeley Club Challenge, Brengle won her 17th ITF title by defeating second seed, Yuan Yue, in the final. As the top seed at the Central Coast Open in Templeton, California, she won her 18th ITF title by beating qualifier and compatriot, Robin Montgomery, in the final. This was her second straight USTA pro circuit tournament. As a result of winning those two tournaments, her ranking moved back into the top 50 at No. 48 on October 3, 2022. In San Diego, she fell in the first round of qualifying to compatriot Caroline Dolehide. As the top seed and defending champion at the Mercer Classic in Macon, Georgia, she successfully defended her title and won her 19th ITF title by beating second seed, Panna Udvardy, in the final. Seeded second at the Christus Health Challenge, she lost in the first round to qualifier and compatriot, Alexis Blokhina. Brengle played her final tournament of the season at the Dow Tennis Classic in Midland, Michigan. Seeded second and the defending champion, she lost in the second round to compatriot Sofia Kenin.

Brengle ended the year ranked No. 57.

2023
Brengle started her season at the ASB Classic in Auckland. Seeded sixth, she lost in the first round to Zhu Lin. At the Hobart International, she was defeated in the first round by sixth seed and compatriot, Bernarda Pera. At the Australian Open, she was eliminated from the tournament in the first round by compatriot Claire Liu.

Competing at the Lyon Open, Brengle lost in the first round to second seed, world No. 23, and defending champion, Zhang Shuai. At the Linz Open, she got her first win of the year by beating Austrian wildcard, Julia Grabher, in the first round. She was defeated in the second round by fifth seed Donna Vekić. In Qatar, she fell in the final round of qualifying to Viktoriya Tomova. At the Dubai Championships, she lost in the first round of qualifying to Katarina Zavatska. At the first edition of the ATX Open in Austin, Texas, she lost her second-round match to eighth seed and eventual champion, Marta Kostyuk.

Honors
In 2016, Brengle was named to the Delaware Tennis Hall of Fame. She was the youngest person ever to be inducted into the Hall of Fame. That year, she was also the first tennis player granted the Delaware Sportswriters & Broadcasters Association's John J. Brady Delaware Athlete of the Year Award.

Performance timelines

Only main-draw results in WTA Tour, Grand Slam tournaments, Fed Cup/Billie Jean King Cup and Olympic Games are included in win–loss records.

Singles
Current after the 2023 ATX Open.

Doubles

WTA career finals

Singles: 1 (1 runner–up)

WTA 125 tournament finals

Singles: 2 (2 titles)

Doubles: 1 (1 title)

ITF Circuit finals

Singles: 30 (19 titles, 11 runner–ups)

Doubles: 13 (7 titles, 6 runner–ups)

Head-to-head record

Record against top 10 players
Active players are in boldface.

Top 10 wins

See also
 List of select Jewish tennis players

Notes

References

External links
 
 

1990 births
Living people
American female tennis players
Jewish American sportspeople
Jewish tennis players
People from Dover, Delaware
Tennis people from Delaware
21st-century American Jews
21st-century American women